Donald Harris (born November 12, 1967) is a former Major League Baseball player. He attended Texas Tech University.

Career
Harris was a first round draft pick (5th overall) by the Texas Rangers in the 1989 MLB Draft. He played in the major leagues from 1991 to 1993 for the Rangers, primarily as an outfielder. In his 82 games, he had a .205 batting average, and 24 hits. He participates in the community by attending and participating in various camps and appearances, where he serves as a motivational speaker and mentor to youth.

References

External links

Retrosheet
Mexican League statistics
Venezuelan Professional Baseball League statistics

1967 births
Living people
Acereros de Monclova players
African-American baseball players
American expatriate baseball players in Mexico
Baseball players from Texas
Bend Bandits players
Butte Copper Kings players
Caribes de Oriente players
Gastonia Rangers players
Lubbock Crickets players
Madison Black Wolf players
Major League Baseball outfielders
Mexican League baseball players
Oklahoma City 89ers players
Rojos del Águila de Veracruz players
Sportspeople from Waco, Texas
Sonoma County Crushers players
Texas Rangers players
Texas Tech Red Raiders baseball players
Tiburones de La Guaira players
American expatriate baseball players in Venezuela
Tulsa Drillers players
Tri-City Posse players
21st-century African-American people
20th-century African-American sportspeople